A hierophant is a person who brings religious congregants into the presence of that which is deemed holy. As such, a hierophant is an interpreter of sacred mysteries and arcane principles.

Greek priesthood

In Attica, Hierophant was the title of the chief priest at the Eleusinian Mysteries. It was an office inherited within the Philaidae or Eumolpidae families. The office of Hierophant, High Priestess and Dadouchousa Priestess were all inherited within the Philaidae or Eumolpidae families, and the Hierophant and the High Priestess were of equal rank.  It was the task of the High Priestess to impersonate the roles of the goddesses Demeter and Persephone in the enactment during the Mysteries.

Eunapius and Vettius Agorius Praetextatus are notable examples.

In modern culture

Rider Waite tarot
In the Rider–Waite tarot deck and similar decks, "The Hierophant" (known in the Tarot de Marseille as "The Pope") is one of the twenty-two trump cards comprising the "Major Arcana", and represents conformity to social standards, or a deference to the established social moral order. As the guide towards knowledge, insight, and wisdom, in a Tarot reading it might, for example, represent a priest, scholar, therapist, or teacher, possibly similar to the Hermit or the King of Cups cards.

A. E. Waite wrote that the Hierophant:...symbolizes also all things that are righteous and sacred on the manifest side. As such, he is the channel of grace belonging to the world of institution as distinct from that of Nature, and he is the leader of salvation for the human race at large. He is the order and the head of the recognized hierarchy, which is the reflection of another and greater hierarchic order; but it may so happen that the pontiff forgets the significance of his symbolic state and acts as if he contained within his proper measures all that his sign signifies or his symbol seeks to shew [sp] forth. He is not, as it has been thought, philosophy—except on the theological side; he is not inspiration; and his is not religion, although he is a mode of its expression.

In Dungeons & Dragons 
The original Unearthed Arcana supplement to 1st edition AD&D detailed how the 15th-level Grand Druid (the in-game head of all druids) could step down from his position and become a 16th-level Hierophant. In 3rd edition D&D, the hierophant prestige class for high-level divine spellcasters appeared in the Forgotten Realms Campaign Setting and in the 3.5e Dungeon Master's Guide.

See also

 Daduchos
 Hierophany
 Hierophylakes
 Mystagogue
 Patriarchate
 Pontifex, "bridge-builder" between Heaven and Earth or between the spiritual world and the temporal one
 Sacred mysteries

References

External links
Britannica article
The last hierophant at Eleusis
Dictionary definition
Definition from alt religion

Eleusinian Mysteries
Esoteric schools of thought
Ancient Greek titles
Ancient Athenian religious titles
Ancient Greek priests